Caffrocrambus husserli is a moth in the family Crambidae. It was described by Graziano Bassi in 2002. It is found in Lesotho.

References

Crambinae
Moths described in 2002
Moths of Africa